Joseph James Coleman FRSE (often referred to simply as J. J. Coleman) (1838–1888) is credited with invention of a mechanical dry-air refrigeration process first used in the sailing ship ‘’Dunedin’’ and sometimes referred to (as a ship type) as Reefer ships. The process focussed upon the use of compressed air for its chilling effects. The effect, which also led to the development of air-conditioning, is known as the Bell-Coleman effect or Bell-Coleman Cycle.

Life

Little is known of his life other than he began his career as an industrial chemist with Young’s Paraffin, Light and Mineral Oil Company in central Scotland.
He was a Fellow of the Chemical Institute and a member of the Glasgow Philosophical Society.

In 1877 he was approached by Henry and James Bell, brothers in the shipping company John Bell & Sons, and asked to create a refrigeration process for delivering beef across the Atlantic. This was patented later that year. Together they formed a new company, the Bell-Coleman Mechanical Refrigeration Company, in the same year. In 1879 they fitted out the first ship with the equipment and began trading. This was the SS Circassia. In 1880/81 at the request of New Zealand investors the sailing ship Dunedin was re-equipped as a refrigerated ship and became the first financially successful vessel as a freezer ship. The Bell brothers also took the new technology to the High Street, opening a series of butcher shops across Britain selling chilled meat also from 1879. This quickly grew, and within ten years they had 330 premises.

In the 1880s the Bell-Coleman Company is listed as having offices at 45 West Nile Street in the centre of Glasgow and J J Coleman was living at Fern Villa in Bothwell.

Coleman was elected a Fellow of the Royal Society of Edinburgh in 1886, and addressed the Society on his new process. His proposers as a Fellow included Lord Kelvin, John Gray McKendrick, James Thomson Bottomley and Sir James Dewar.

He died on 18 December 1888.

References

1838 births
1888 deaths
19th-century Scottish people
Scottish inventors
Fellows of the Royal Society of Edinburgh